Charles L. Meach, III (1948–2004) was a mentally ill American murderer who killed five people in Alaska.

He was born in Traverse City, Michigan, to a mother who had schizophrenia. He left home at sixteen to travel and accumulated a long record of minor crimes.

He made his way to Anchorage, Alaska, and in 1973 he beat 22-year-old Robert Johnson, who worked as a grocery clerk, to death in Earthquake Park. He was charged with murder, found not guilty by reason of insanity and sent to a mental hospital in California. In 1980, psychiatrists decided that his illness was in remission and he was returned to Alaska under the supervision of the Alaska Psychiatric Institute. On May 3, 1982, armed with a .38-caliber revolver that he had bought from a man on the street, he shot four teenagers to death in Russian Jack Springs Park; two 19-year-old boys while robbing their campsite and one 16 year old girl and one 17 year old girl. The teens were planning on going to the movies, when Meech shot them in cold blood.  He confessed to the killings when confronted and was charged. He again pleaded not guilty by reason of insanity, but was convicted and sentenced to 396 years in prison without the possibility of parole — the longest sentence in the state's history.

In response to the shootings, the Alaska Legislature revised the criminal statutes on the sentencing of the mentally ill, providing for a new verdict "guilty, but mentally ill" where the convicted will serve their time in a mental institution until deemed healthy, then be transferred to prison for the rest of their sentence.  This revision did not apply to Meach's trial, or consequently his sentence.  The legislature also narrowed the definition of insanity and tightened the burden of proof for the basic insanity defense.  This resulted in Alaska having one of the strictest conditions for the insanity defense of all US states.

He died of natural causes on December 9, 2004, in the Cook Inlet jail.

References 

1948 births
2004 deaths
American people convicted of murder
People acquitted by reason of insanity
People convicted of murder by Alaska
People from Anchorage, Alaska
People from Traverse City, Michigan
Prisoners who died in Alaska detention
American mass murderers
American murderers of children
American people who died in prison custody